This was the first edition of the tournament. Karen Khachanov won his first ATP World Tour title, defeating Albert Ramos Viñolas in the final, 6−7(4−7), 7−6(7−3), 6−3.

Seeds
The top four seeds receive a bye into the second round.

Draw

Finals

Top half

Bottom half

Qualifying

Seeds

Qualifiers

Qualifying draw

First qualifier

Second qualifier

Third qualifier

Fourth qualifier

References
 Main Draw
 Qualifying Draw

2016 ATP World Tour
2016 Singles
2016 in Chinese tennis